Robb Gravett (born 10 May 1956 (sometimes noted as  2 May 1956) is a British retired racing driver and team owner from London. He started his motorsport career on two wheels, racing Moto Cross at the age of 12. By 15, he was already British champion, but decided to switch to four-wheeled racing in his early 20s. Robb began racing cars in 1978, eventually entering the British Touring Car Championship in 1987.

He won the 1987 Willhire 24 Hour co-driving with Graham Hathaway and entered the Bathurst 1000 on four occasions with a best finish of 8th in 1989. He went on to win the 1990 British Touring Car Championship winner with his own Trakstar team, in a Ford Sierra RS500 built by Australian team Dick Johnson Racing who it was widely acknowledged built the fastest Group A Ford Sierras in touring car racing.

Trakstar Motorsport 

Gravett co-founded Trakstar in 1989 with Mike Smith – Robb finished 2nd in his class that year, behind Andy Rouse's Ford Sierra RS500. In 1990 he won 9 races in the sole Trakstar RS500 (a car built by Dick Johnson Racing in Australia), enjoying a fierce on-track rivalry with Rouse. There were 4 different classes of cars racing for the same title in those days, each scoring points based on where they finished among their own class. Robb dominated his class and won the championship outright, the only driver to take the overall title in the Sierra RS500, despite operating on a shoestring budget. The key to Gravett's success was the Yokohama tyres that Trakstar used, which were more durable than the Dunlop rubber used by most of the field. During 1990, Gravett had a run in two races in the DTM championship, but did not score any points. Trakstar also built the Honda Civic run under the PG Tips Racing banner for Ray Armes that season.

The championship changed to a single-class in 1991, and Trakstar secured manufacturer support from Ford to run Sierra Sapphires that year with sponsorship from Shell Oil and engines prepared by Mountune, however Gravett was short on good results. Originally planned to be one of two cars run by the team, a second bodyshell was built but never completed. The Sierra Sapphire arrived late and had not turned a wheel before the first round at Silverstone. This led to a difficult development period and the team experimented with different engine and gearbox configurations and even four wheel drive in an effort to catch up. The car was down on power and difficult to set up. Results started to come towards the end of the year but it was too late. Despite being the works outfit, Ford was not investing in the team or the car's development costs. Unable to find a new title sponsor, the team struggled with lack of funds throughout the year and by the end of the season were forced into administration. Ford took a year out in 1992 before returning to the BTCC in 1993 with Andy Rouse.

Later career 

Gravett joined the factory Peugeot squad for 1992 and 1993. Peugeot had great success in European touring car racing, but never challenged in the BTCC, partly because of budgetary issues. The 405  needed a lot of development work, but Gravett pressed on, nearly winning the TOCA challenge at the end of 1992. He managed to finish 2nd at Brands Hatch in 1993, matching Peugeot's best ever result in the BTCC. Steve Soper had made a forceful move on him on the last lap, but was given a penalty and placed in third. He didn't have a drive in 1994, and returned a year later as an independent driver.

Despite his success, the BTCC teams at the time were increasingly promoting international drivers and Gravett would not drive for a works team again. He turned his attention to running as a privateer, but was no less committed, including a then best 3rd overall finish at Snetterton for an independent. He went on to win the Total sponsored 1997 Independent BTCC Championship in a Graham Hathaway prepared Honda Accord. He drove for Brookes Motorsport in his final year of racing, finishing second in the Independents' Cup. He partnered Brookes at that year's Bathurst 1000, but failed to finish. Gravett was reported to be considering a comeback to the BTCC in 2014, but ultimately this came to nothing.

Gravett is now running a driver safety driving programme called "Ultimate Car Control UK Ltd" with the head office at Crowthorne in Berkshire and regional centres across the county. He is also a Director of Brand Synergy- a consortium hoping to save the British Grand Prix.

He is now divorced. He has a son who has started a career in motorsport, running in the BARC Sax Max Championship.

Racing record

Complete British Touring Car Championship results
(key) Races in bold indicate pole position (1 point awarded – 1996 onwards all races) Races in italics indicate fastest lap (1 point awarded – 1987–1989 in class) ( signifies that driver lead feature race for at least one lap – 1 point given in 1998 only)

 – Race was stopped due to heavy rain. No points were awarded.

Complete European Touring Car Championship results

(key) (Races in bold indicate pole position) (Races in italics indicate fastest lap)

Complete Asia-Pacific Touring Car Championship results
(key) (Races in bold indicate pole position) (Races in italics indicate fastest lap)

Complete Deutsche Tourenwagen Meisterschaft results
(key) (Races in bold indicate pole position) (Races in italics indicate fastest lap)

Complete Japanese Touring Car Championship results
(key) (Races in bold indicate pole position) (Races in italics indicate fastest lap)

Complete Bathurst 1000 results

* Super Touring race

References

External links
Profile from www.Supertouring.co.uk
Ultimate Car Control
About Robb

British Touring Car Championship drivers
British Touring Car Championship Champions
Living people
1952 births
Australian Endurance Championship drivers
Peugeot Sport drivers
Dick Johnson Racing drivers